Gegetuy (Gegeete) is a rural locality (a selo) in Dzhidinsky District, Republic of Buryatia, Russia. The population was 1,253 as of 2010. There are 7 streets.

Geography 
Gegetuy is located 10 km northwest of Petropavlovka (the district's administrative centre) by road. Bulyk is the nearest rural locality.

References 

Rural localities in Dzhidinsky District